Francis Ormond Nielsen (1 March 1891 – 3 December 1970) was an Australian rules footballer who played with Footscray in the Victorian Football League (VFL).

Notes

External links 

1891 births
1970 deaths
Australian rules footballers from Victoria (Australia)
Footscray Football Club (VFA) players
Western Bulldogs players